The Belvedere is a historic building complex in Vienna, Austria, consisting of two Baroque palaces (the Upper and Lower Belvedere), the Orangery, and the Palace Stables. The buildings are set in a Baroque park landscape in the third district of the city, on the south-eastern edge of its centre. It houses the Belvedere museum. The grounds are set on a gentle gradient and include decorative tiered fountains and cascades, Baroque sculptures, and majestic wrought iron gates. The Baroque palace complex was built as a summer residence for Prince Eugene of Savoy.

The Belvedere was built during a period of extensive construction in Vienna, which at the time was both the imperial capital and home to the ruling Habsburg dynasty. This period of prosperity followed on from the commander-in-chief Prince Eugene of Savoy's successful conclusion of a series of wars against the Ottoman Empire.

Lower Belvedere 
On 30 November 1697, one year after commencing with the construction of the Stadtpalais, Prince Eugene purchased a sizable plot of land south of the Rennweg, the main road to Hungary. Plans for the Belvedere garden complex were drawn up immediately. The prince chose Johann Lukas von Hildebrandt as the chief architect for this project rather than Johann Bernhard Fischer von Erlach, the creator of his Stadtpalais. Hildebrandt (1668–1745), whom the general had met whilst engaged in a military campaign in Piedmont, had already built Ráckeve Palace for him in 1702 on Csepel, an island in the Danube south of Budapest. He later went on to build numerous other edifices in his service. The architect had studied civil engineering in Rome under Carlo Fontana and had gone into imperial service in 1695–96 in order to learn how to build fortifications. From 1696 onwards, records show that he was employed as a court architect in Vienna. As well as the Belvedere, Hildebrandt's most outstanding achievements include the Schloss Hof Palace, which was also commissioned by Prince Eugene, the Schwarzenberg Palace (formerly known as the Mansfeld–Fondi Palace), the Kinsky Palace, as well as the entire Göttweig Monastery estate in the Wachau Valley.

At the time that the prince was planning to buy the land on the outskirts of Vienna for his Belvedere project, the area was completely undeveloped – an ideal place to construct a landscaped garden and summer palace. However, a month before the prince made his acquisition, the imperial Grand Marshal Count Heinrich Franz von Mansfeld, Prince of Fondi, purchased the neighboring plot and commissioned Hildebrandt to build a garden palace on the land. To buy the plot, Prince Eugene was forced to take out a large loan secured against his Stadtpalais, which was still in the process of being built. He bought additional neighboring areas of land in 1708, 1716, and again in 1717–18 to allow him to expand the garden in stages.

Records indicate that the construction of the Lower Belvedere had started by 1712, as Prince Eugene submitted the request for a building inspection on 5 July 1713. Work proceeded swiftly, and Marcantonio Chiarini from Bologna started painting the quadratura in the central hall in 1715. The ambassador from the Spanish Flanders visited the Lower Belvedere, as well as the Stadtpalais, in April 1716. Extensive work was carried out on the grounds at the same time as construction went ahead on the Lustschloss, as the Lower Belvedere was described on an early cityscape. Dominique Girard changed the plans for the garden significantly between January and May 1717, so that it could be completed by the following summer. Girard, who was employed as fontainier du roi, or the king's water engineer, in Versailles from 1707 to 1715, had started working as a garden inspector for the Bavarian elector Maximilian Emanuel from 1715 onwards. It was on the latter's recommendation that he entered Prince Eugene's employ. The statuary for the balustrade is the best known work of Giovanni Stanetti.

Gardens 

The garden had a scenery enclosed by clipped hedging, even as the Belvedere was building, in the formal French manner with gravelled walks and jeux d'eau by Dominique Girard, who had trained in the gardens of Versailles as a pupil of André Le Nôtre. Its great water basin in the upper parterre and the stairs and cascades peopled by nymphs and goddesses that links upper and lower parterres survive, but the patterned bedding has long been grassed over; it is currently being restored.

Upper Belvedere 

The construction of the Upper Belvedere began as early as 1717, as testified by two letters that Prince Eugene sent from Belgrade to his servant Benedetti in summer 1718, describing the progress of work on the palace. Construction was so far advanced by 2 October 1719 that the prince was able to receive the Turkish ambassador Ibrahim Pasha there. The decoration of the interior started as early as 1718. In 1719 he commissioned the Italian painter Francesco Solimena to execute both the altarpiece for the Palace Chapel and the ceiling fresco in the Golden Room. In the same year Gaetano Fanti was commissioned to execute the illusionistic quadratura painting in the Marble Hall. In 1720 Carlo Carlone was entrusted with the task of painting the ceiling fresco in the Marble Hall, which he executed from 1721 to 1723.

The building was completed in 1723. The Sala Terrena, however, was at risk of collapsing due to structural problems, and in the winter of 1732–33 Hildebrandt was forced to install a vaulted ceiling supported by four Atlas pillars, giving the room its current appearance. Salomon Kleiner, an engineer from the Mainz elector's court, produced a ten-part publication between 1731 and 1740 containing a total of ninety plates, entitled Wunder würdiges Kriegs- und Siegs-Lager deß Unvergleichlichen Heldens Unserer Zeiten Eugenii Francisci Hertzogen zu Savoyen und Piemont ("Wondrous war and victory encampment of the supreme hero of our age Eugene Francis Duke of Savoy and Piedmont"), which documented in precise detail the state of the Belvedere complex.

The Upper Belvedere appears on the 20-cent Austrian euro coin.

After the death of Prince Eugene 

When Prince Eugene died in his City Palace in Vienna on 21 April 1736, he did not leave a legally binding will. A commission set up by the Holy Roman Emperor Charles VI named the prince's niece Victoria as his heir. She was the daughter of his eldest brother Thomas and the only surviving member of the house of Savoy-Soissons. Princess Victoria moved into the Belvedere, known at that point as the Gartenpalais, on 6 July 1736, but immediately made clear that she was not interested in her inheritance and aimed to auction off the palace complex as soon as possible. On 15 April 1738, she married Prince Joseph of Saxe-Hildburghausen (1702–87), who was several years her junior, in the presence of the royal family in the Schlosshof in the Marchfeld region, Lower Austria. Her choice of husband proved an unfortunate one, however, and the poorly-matched couple divorced in 1744. Yet it was only when Princess Victoria finally decided to leave Vienna and return to her home city of Turin, Italy, eight years later that Maria Theresa, the daughter of Charles VI, was able to purchase the estate.

The imperial couple never moved into the Gartenpalais, which was first described as the Belvedere in their sales contract of November 1752. The complex was somewhat eclipsed by the other imperial palaces, and at first the buildings were left unused. Maria Theresa later created an ancestors' gallery of the Habsburg dynasty in the Lower Belvedere, as was the custom in all other palaces belonging to the imperial family. The palace was only once awakened from its slumbers in 1770 when a masked ball was staged there on 17 April to mark the occasion of the Imperial Princess Maria Antonia's marriage with the French Dauphin, who was later to become Louis XVI. The Lord High Chamberlain Prince Johann Joseph Khevenhüller-Metsch and the court architect Nicolaus Pacassi were charged with taking care of the extensive preparations for the ball to which 16,000 guests were invited.

In 1776, Maria Theresa and her son, Emperor Joseph II decided to transfer the k.u.k. Gemäldegalerie ("Imperial Picture Gallery") from the Imperial Stables – a part of the city's Hofburg Imperial Palace – to the Upper Belvedere. Inspired by the idea of enlightened absolutism, the intention was to make the imperial collection accessible to the general public. The gallery opened five years later, making it one of the first public museums in the world. A series of eminent painters served as directors in charge of the imperial collection in the Upper Belvedere up to 1891 when it was transferred to the newly built Kunsthistorisches Museum (Museum of Fine Arts) on Vienna's splendid Ringstrasse.

While the Upper Belvedere was transformed into a picture gallery at the end of the eighteenth century, the Lower Belvedere served chiefly to royal family members fleeing from the French Revolution. Most notably these included Princess Marie Thérèse Charlotte, the sole surviving child of Marie Antoinette and Louis XVI, and Archduke Ferdinand. Marie Thérèse Charlotte resided in the palace until her marriage with Prince Louis Antoine, Duke of Angoulême, in 1799. Archduke Ferdinand, the former Governor of the Duchy of Milan up to 1796, went to live there after the Treaty of Campo Formio in 1797.

After the Habsburg Monarchy was forced to cede Tyrol to Bavaria in the Treaty of Pressburg in 1805, a new home had to be found for the imperial collection from Ambras Castle, near Innsbruck. At first, the collection was taken to Petrovaradin (now in Novi Sad, Vojvodina, Serbia) to protect it from looting by French troops. In 1811 Emperor Francis II decreed that it should be installed in the Lower Belvedere, which was, in fact, far too small for the collection. This part of the Belvedere thus also took on the function of a museum and had already started to draw considerable numbers of visitors by the time of the Congress of Vienna (1814–15).

Under the directorship of the Prefect of the Imperial Court Library, Moritz, Count of Dietrichstein-Proskau-Leslie, the Collection of Egyptian Antiquities and the Antiquities Room were added to the Ambras Collection in the Lower Belvedere collection from 1833 onwards. In 1844, the Roman milestones, which had been stored in the catacombs of the Theseus Temple up to that point, were relocated to an open-air location in the Privy Garden. Watercolors by Carl Goebel the Younger pay testimony to the Lower Belvedere's beginnings as a museum, as does Joseph Bergmann's descriptive guide to the collection that dates from 1846. This situation remained almost unchanged until the move to the newly built Kunsthistorisches Museum in the Ringstrasse in 1888–89.

Belvedere and Franz Ferdinand 
Following the relocation of the imperial collections, both of the Belvedere Palaces ceased to be public museums for a while at least. In 1896 Emperor Franz Joseph I decided that the Upper Belvedere should serve as a residence for the heir to the throne, his nephew Franz Ferdinand. The heir presumptive had the palace remodeled under the supervision of the architect Emil von Förster, who was also imperial undersecretary, and it served from that point onwards as Franz Ferdinand's residence. By contrast, the Moderne Galerie was opened a few years later, on 2 May 1903, in the Lower Belvedere. This museum was the first state collection in Austria that was exclusively dedicated to modern art and came about upon the instigation of the Union of Austrian Artists, known as the Vienna Secession. The aim was to juxtapose Austrian art with international modernism. From the outset, major works by Vincent van Gogh, Claude Monet, and Giovanni Segantini were bought for the Moderne Galerie. The museum was then renamed the k.u.k. Staatsgalerie ("Imperial and Royal Gallery") in 1911 after it was decided to expand the focus beyond modern art to include works from earlier eras. The assassination of heir-apparent Franz Ferdinand and his wife, the outbreak of World War I, and the ensuing collapse of the Habsburg Monarchy in 1918 marked the start of a new era for the Belvedere.

Belvedere in the First and Second Republic 

Shortly after the end of the war in November 1918, the art historian Franz Haberditzl submitted a request to the Ministry of Education, asking for the palaces to be left to the Staatsgalerie. This application was granted the very next year. The nationalization of the Belvedere palace complex was also laid down in the draft document to reorganize the former imperial collections drawn up by Hans Tietze in 1920–21. In addition to the museums that still exist today, it also included plans to set up an Österreichische Galerie (Austrian Gallery) and a Moderne Galerie. During the 1921–23 reorganization the Baroque Museum in the Lower Belvedere was added to the existing museum ensemble. The Moderne Galerie was opened in the Orangery in 1929.

The palaces suffered considerable damage during World War II. Parts of the Marble Hall in the Upper Belvedere and the Hall of Grotesques in the Lower Belvedere were destroyed by bombs. After reconstruction work was completed, the Österreichische Galerie reopened in the upper palace on 4 February 1953. The Baroque Museum opened in the lower palace and the Museum mittelalterlicher österreichischer Kunst ("Museum of Medieval Austrian Art") opened in the Orangery on 5 December 1953.

The Lower Belvedere and the Orangery have been specially adapted to stage special exhibitions. After winning an invitation-only competition, architect Susanne Zottl turned the Orangery into a modern exhibition hall whilst still preserving the building's original Baroque fabric. This venue opened in March 2007 with the exhibition Gartenlust: Der Garten in der Kunst (Garden Pleasures: The Garden in Art). A few months later the Lower Belvedere reopened with the show Vienna – Paris. The redesign of the building was carried out by the Berlin architect Wilfried Kuehn, who moved the entrance back to its place in the cour d'honneur, thereby once more freeing up the original line of vision from the main gate of the Lower Belvedere via the Marble Hall to the garden facade of the Upper Belvedere. The various sections of the original orangeries annexed to the Marble Hall were returned to their original condition and now provide space for the new exhibition rooms. The magnificent Baroque state rooms – the Marble Gallery, the Golden Room, and the Hall of Grotesques – remain unchanged and are open to the public.

Gallery

Nazi-looted art controversies and restitutions 
 On August 26, 1959 Holocaust survivor Alice Morgenstern filed a claim to the Finanzlandesdirektion für Wien, Niederösterreich und das Burgenland (Provincial Tax Office for Vienna, Lower Austria and Burgenland) in which she stated, "the picture Four Trees by Egon Schiele, which used to be owned by us, is now hanging in the Upper Belvedere. We never sold the picture but gave it to a friend, Robert Röhrl, lawyer in Vienna, Gumpendorferstrasse, for safekeeping. He unfortunately died, and I do not know how the picture landed in the nineteenth-century [recte twentieth-century] collection in the Belvedere." On March 20, 2020, the Austrian Advisory Commission recommended that the Schiele be restituted to Morgenstern's heirs 
 In November 2006, after more than five decades of legal disputes, a panel ruled that Edvard Munch's "Summer Night at the Beach", on display at Vienna's Belvedere Gallery, was to be returned to Marina Fistoulari-Mahler, granddaughter and sole heir of Alma Mahler, wife of Austrian composer Gustav Mahler.
 In 2006 Austria returned five paintings by Gustav Klimt, from the Belvedere, to the heirs of Adele Bloch-Bauer.
In 2006 the Austrian arbitration panel decided that the portrait of "Amalie Zuckerkandl" by Gustav Klimt was not looted by the Nazis and did not need to be restituted. The decision caused much commentary, in part because Amalie Zuckerkandl perished with her daughter in Auschwitz and in part because, as MSNBC reported "Rather than return this obviously looted painting, an Austrian arbitration panel concluded that it should stay in the Belvedere."
In 2012 a documentary Portrait of Wally told how Egon Schiele's famous portrait, which had  belonged to a Viennese art dealer named Lea Bondi until the Nazi Friedrich Welz confiscated it from her private collection in 1939, was restituted by mistake to the Belvedere Museum in Austria after World War II as part of another dealer's collection.
In 2014 the Belvedere was ordered to restitute "Farmer's Kitchen / Kitchen Interior" by Wilhelm Leibl to the heirs of Martha Liebermann - Max Liebermann's widow due to Nazi persecution.

See also 
 List of Baroque residences

References

External links 

  
 Belvedere  at Google Cultural Institute

Houses completed in 1723
Buildings and structures in Landstraße
Palaces in Vienna
Museums in Vienna
Imperial residences in Austria
Baroque palaces in Austria
Baroque architecture in Vienna
Historic house museums in Austria
Art museums and galleries in Vienna
Gardens in Austria
Art museums established in 1781
1723 establishments in Austria